Otothyris juquiae is a species of armored catfish endemic to Brazil, where it is found in the Ribeira de Iguape River basin.  This species grows to a length of  SL.

References
 

Otothyrinae
Fish of South America
Fish of Brazil
Endemic fauna of Brazil
Taxa named by Júlio César Garavello
Taxa named by Heraldo Antonio Britski
Taxa named by Scott Allen Schaefer
Fish described in 1998